Daniel Tchuř (born 8 August 1976) is former Czech footballer.

Daniel is a product of FC Vítkovice. He did his military service in Znojmo before returning north to Ostrava again. SK Slavia Praha showed interest for him then so he moved there. Via FK Mladá Boleslav and Újpest FC he ended up with FC Baník Ostrava. In 2010, he moved to regional Second League side, MFK Karviná.

References

External links
 
 

1976 births
Living people
Czech footballers
MFK Vítkovice players
SK Slavia Prague players
FC Baník Ostrava players
FK Mladá Boleslav players
FC Petržalka players
MFK Karviná players
Újpest FC players
Expatriate footballers in Slovakia
Expatriate footballers in Hungary
Slovak Super Liga players
Sportspeople from Ostrava
Association football midfielders